The Bandian Fire Temple is an archaeological site in Dargaz County, Razavi Khorasan Province, Iran, near the medieval city Abiward. The primary excavations were carried out to reveal precious remains of art and architecture of the pre-Islamic Iran, dating from the Sassanian period (224-651 AD) when the archaeological significance of Bandian was recognized.

Found at the site, near the town of Dargaz were a stucco-decorated hall with columns, Sassanian Pahlavi inscriptions, and at last the some remains of brick architecture, which are considered to be one of the most invaluable finds of that period. Additionally, the excavations yielded a Zoroastrian sanctuary, with a substantial amount of its decoration and design features undamaged. while the upper parts of the stucco reliefs were not preserved, but a good deal had remained in place (info from Bandian of Daregaz).

Throughout six seasons of the site's excavations, the building's central part was found; its main hall, measuring 10.25x8.45 m, as well as a number of rooms and corridors were unearthed. The hall had four lime columns that supported the flat ceiling of the structure. The columns' strengthening structure is quite interesting. Another outstanding facet of the building is its mihrab (arched niche) in about 2.80x1.70 m.

The large hall features extensive stucco reliefs, depicting scenes of a hunt, battle, triumph, ritual, investiture, and banquet. It contains depictions of Persian victories in the Hephthalite–Persian Wars.

The complex has been dated to the reign of Peroz (459-484 CE) or his son Kavad I (488-497 CE).

The excavated area has been turned into a site-museum.

References

Archaeological sites in Iran
Buildings and structures in Razavi Khorasan Province
Nishapur Quarter
Fire temples in Iran
5th century in Iran
Sasanian architecture
Sasanian art